Joseph A. Petrarca Sr. (December 20, 1928 – March 13, 1995) is a former Democratic member of the Pennsylvania House of Representatives.

References

Democratic Party members of the Pennsylvania House of Representatives
1995 deaths
1928 births
20th-century American politicians